Rosanne Kohake, née Lipps (b. 20 July 1951 in Cincinnati, Ohio, United States - d. 7 March 2012 in Cincinnati) was an American writer, who has written three historical romance novels published from 1984 to 1985 by Avon Books. Her novels have been translated into other languages, and her debut novel, For Honor's Lady, has been selected as one of the All-Time Favorites & Classics by the Romantic Times Magazine.

Biography
Rosanne Frances Lipps was born on 20 July 1951 in Cincinnati, Ohio, United States.

She published three historical romances placed in different moments of the United States of America's history, published from 1984 to 1985 by Avon Books. Her first novel, For Honor's Lady, was placed in the American Revolution, her second novel, Chastity Morrow, in the American West, and her last novel, Ambrosia, in the Civil War.

She died of multiple myeloma on 7 March 2012, survived by her husband of nearly 40 years, David F. Kohake, and their 3 children: Beth, David Jr., and Claire.

Bibliography

Single novels
For Honor's Lady (1984/Jan)
Chastity Morrow (1985/Jan)
Ambrosia (1985/Oct)

References and sources

1951 births
2012 deaths
Deaths from multiple myeloma
20th-century American novelists
American romantic fiction writers
American women novelists
20th-century American women writers
21st-century American women